Sagrahuagra (possibly from Quechua saqra malignant, pernicious, bad, bad tempered, wicked; restless; devil, synonym of supay, waqra horn, "devil's horn") is a  mountain in the Andes of Peru which reaches a height of approximately . It is located in the Huánuco Region, Huánuco Province, Churubamba District.

References

Mountains of Peru
Mountains of Huánuco Region